Natalia Grossman (born June 22, 2001) is an American professional rock climber. She represents the United States at IFSC Climbing World Cup in bouldering and lead,. She won a gold and a silver medal at the 2021 IFSC Climbing World Championships and has 14 podium finishes at Climbing World Cup events, including seven gold medals.

Early life and youth competitions
Grossman grew up in Santa Cruz, California and at age six, began climbing at the Pacific Edge climbing gym where Chris Sharma also climbed in his youth. She joined the Zero Gravity team that trained at Berkeley Ironworks, a gym that was an hour and 45 minutes away in Berkeley, California. Following Zero Gravity's disbanding in 2014, her family moved to Boulder, Colorado in 2015 so she could train with Robyn Erbesfield-Raboutou's Team ABC.

Grossman finished second in bouldering and combined disciplines at the 2019 IFSC Climbing World Youth Championships in Arco, Italy, where she also finished fourth in speed and sixth in lead.

Senior competitions
In 2019, Grossman went undefeated in the d bouldering National Cup Series and won the USA Climbing 2020 Bouldering Open National Championship. Also in 2019, 17-year-old Grossman advanced to the semifinal of the Boulder World Cup in Vail, Colorado, finishing seventh, one place short of a spot in the final round.

At the USA Climbing National Team Trials in March 2021, Grossman finished first in bouldering and second in lead, qualifying for the United States national team in both disciplines. In April 2021, Grossman advanced to the final and finished third at the opening Boulder World Cup of the 2021 IFSC Climbing World Cup season in Meiringen. In May 2021, across two IFSC events held in Salt Lake City, Grossman won her first two World Cup gold medals, topping all four boulders in the final in the first event and flashing all four final boulders in the second, beating Janja Garnbret, who also topped all four boulders, on attempts, becoming the first woman to beat Garnbret in a Boulder World Cup since 2018. In Lead, Grossman finished on the podium in four of the five events, winning two silver and bronze medals each, and finished second overall for the season.

World Cup podiums

Lead

Bouldering

Outdoor
With competitions in 2020 canceled due to the COVID-19 pandemic, Grossman focused on outdoor climbs for the first time in her career with fellow American climber Brooke Raboutou. Grossman sent four V13 (8B)-rated boulders in the Rocky Mountain National Park and topped the 5.14B (8C)-rated Positive Vibrations.

Personal life
Grossman attended the University of Colorado Boulder and graduated in 2022. In January 2021, she moved to Salt Lake City to train at USA Climbing's national team base while she continued taking classes online.

References

External links

American female climbers
Living people
2001 births
American rock climbers
Sportspeople from Santa Cruz, California
Sportspeople from Boulder, Colorado
University of Colorado Boulder people
21st-century American women
IFSC Climbing World Championships medalists
IFSC Climbing World Cup overall medalists
Boulder climbers